Derek McCormack may refer to:

 Derek McCormack (academic), vice-chancellor of the Auckland University of Technology, New Zealand
 Derek McCormack (writer) (born 1969), Canadian novelist and short story writer